Guy Dalrymple McGregor (born 11 July 1930) is a former New Zealand field hockey player. He represented New Zealand in field hockey between 1952 and 1962, including at the 1956 Olympic Games in Melbourne and the 1960 Olympic Games in Rome.

McGregor was educated at Gisborne Boys' High School and the University of Otago, where he studied physical education. He became a schoolteacher, and later was head lecturer in physical education and health at Auckland Teachers' College. In 2011, he was inducted into the Tairawhiti Legend of Sport Hall of Fame in Gisborne.

References

External links

1930 births
Living people
Field hockey players from Whangārei
People educated at Gisborne Boys' High School
University of Otago alumni
New Zealand male field hockey players
Olympic field hockey players of New Zealand
Field hockey players at the 1956 Summer Olympics
Field hockey players at the 1960 Summer Olympics
New Zealand schoolteachers
Academic staff of the University of Auckland